Babelomurex atlantidis is a species of sea snail, a marine gastropod mollusc in the family Muricidae, the murex snails or rock snails.

Description

Distribution
This marine species occurs in the Northeast Atlantic Ocean.

References

atlantidis
Gastropods described in 2006